Bernard Green (September 14, 1908 – August 8, 1975, born Bernard Greenwald) was an American composer. Green composed for radio and television programs, including Your Show of Shows, Mister Peepers and Celanese Theatre. He was nominated for two Primetime Emmy Awards in the category Outstanding Music for his work on the television programs Hallmark Hall of Fame and CBS Playhouse. 

Green died in August 1975 at his home in Westport, Connecticut, at the age of 66.

References

External links 

1908 births
1975 deaths
People from New York City
American composers
American television composers
20th-century American composers